Villagrán may refer to:

Places
Villagrán, Guanajuato, Mexican city and municipality
Villagrán, Tamaulipas, Mexican city and municipality

People
Adriana Villagrán, Argentine tennis player
Carlos Villagrán, Mexican actor
Carolina Villagrán, Chilean biologist
Cristian Villagrán, Swiss-Argentine tennis player
Felipe Villagrán, Chilean footballer
Fernanda Villagran, Chilean field hockey player
Francisco Villagrán Kramer, politician of Guatemala
José Villagrán García, Mexican architect
Julián Villagrán, Spanish actor
Ricardo Villagrán, Argentine illustrator

Spanish-language surnames